The Mysterious Miss Terry is a 1917 American silent drama film produced by Famous Players-Lasky and distributed through Paramount Pictures. The film stars Billie Burke, who at the time was a famous stage actress, married to Florenz Ziegfeld, Jr. This particular story was adapted special to the screen for Burke by writer Gelett Burgess. It is a lost film.

Plot
As described in a film magazine, a fascinating young heiress (Burke) takes rooms at a cheap boarding house and assumes the name Miss Terry. The male boarders immediately fall in love with her and, when she secures a temporary position in a hardware store as a bookkeeper, they all help her keep the books. As a test of the bravery of one of the young men, she arranges for two others to dress as burglars and break into the store at night when she and Gordon True (Meighan) are there. Professional burglars, however, overhear the plan and break into the store first where they steal the money and shoot Gordon. Miss Terry nurses the boy back to health, arranges to have his book published, and assists the other male boarders to better themselves. Miss Terry discloses her identity, and the film ends with wedding bells for her and Gordon.

Cast
Billie Burke - Mavis Terry
Thomas Meighan - Gordon True
Gerald Oliver Smith - John Quig
Walter Hiers - Freddie Bollen
George A. Wright - Mr. Pennyquick
Bessie Hearn - Clara Pennyquick

Reception
Like many American films of the time, The Mysterious Miss Terry was subject to cuts by city and state film censorship boards. The Chicago Board of Censors ordered cut a scene policeman looking up at a statue, seven holdup scenes, a shooting scene, and a scene of a man looking up at a statue.

References

External links

  
The Mysterious Miss Terry; allmovie.com

1917 films
American silent feature films
Films directed by J. Searle Dawley
Lost American films
Famous Players-Lasky films
American mystery drama films
American black-and-white films
1910s mystery drama films
1917 lost films
Lost drama films
1917 drama films
1910s American films
Silent American drama films
Silent mystery drama films